John Eston (by 1518–1565), was an English politician.

He was a Member (MP) of the Parliament of England for Wigan in 1545, Cirencester in 1547 and Southwark in March 1553, April 1554, November 1554, 1555, 1558 and 1559.

References

1565 deaths
Year of birth uncertain
English MPs 1545–1547
English MPs 1547–1552
English MPs 1553 (Edward VI)
English MPs 1554
English MPs 1554–1555
English MPs 1558
English MPs 1559